The Rothmans 50,000 was a motor race held at the Brands Hatch circuit on 28 August 1972 with a prize fund of £50,000.

The race was held to Formula Libre rules, but the top placing three cars were all Formula One cars - with Emerson Fittipaldi winning the race from pole in a Lotus 72, Brian Redman in a McLaren M19A taking second and Henri Pescarolo driving a March 711 finishing third.

The race was run over 118 laps of the full GP circuit and initial plans were for an entry of up to 100 cars with a race for the first thirty qualifiers and a secondary race for qualifiers in positions 30 to 60. The entry list was ultimately lower than expected but a secondary race was still run. This was won by Dave Morgan (Brabham BT38), with Ian Ashley (Lola T191) and Tony Dean (Brabham BT30/36) second and third respectively.

Classification

Qualifying

Race

References

1972 in British motorsport
Auto races in the United Kingdom